In music, an arrangement is a  reconceptualization of a previously composed work.

Arrangement may also refer to:

Mathematics
Arrangement (space partition), a partition of the space by a set of objects of a certain type
Arrangement of hyperplanes
Arrangement of lines
Vertex arrangement, in geometry
Arrangement as a permutation or partial permutation in combinatorics

Social arrangements
Marriage arrangement
Sugar baby, a person who receives material benefits in exchange for company

Other uses
Flower arrangement
Korean flower arrangement
Ikebana, Japanese flower arrangement
Sentence arrangement, the location of ideas and the placement of emphasis within a sentence
Arrangements (album), a 2022 album by Preoccupations
Sorting, any process of arranging items systematically

See also
Arraignment, part of the criminal law process in various jurisdictions
The Arrangement (disambiguation)